Nemanja Grbović (born 26 April 1990) is a Montenegrin handball player for CSA Steaua and the Montenegrin national team.

References

External links

1990 births
Living people
Montenegrin male handball players
Sportspeople from Pljevlja
Expatriate handball players
Montenegrin expatriate sportspeople in Hungary
Montenegrin expatriate sportspeople in Serbia
Montenegrin expatriate sportspeople in Romania